Carlos Gross Pérez (born April 14, 1971) is a former pitcher in Major League Baseball and the brother of former major league players Melido Pérez and Pascual Pérez.

Biography
However, he soon suffered an untimely and devastating injury which forced him to miss the entire 1996 season. After rehabilitation, he re-joined the Expos in  but still displayed steady showings of his All-Star form, earning a career-high 12 wins and leading the majors with five shutouts. After several productive months into the 1998 season, Pérez was traded to the Los Angeles Dodgers on July 31 along with Hiram Bocachica and Mark Grudzielanek for Peter Bergeron, Wilton Guerrero, Ted Lilly, and Jonathan Tucker.

By the time he became a Dodger, his potential for being a dominant left-handed major league pitcher was quickly slipping away. On June 16, 1999, Pérez had an outburst during a game against the Pittsburgh Pirates at Dodger Stadium. After consecutively walking Abraham Nunez, Francisco Córdova and Mike Benjamin to load the bases in the fourth inning, he was removed from the game by Dodger Manager Davey Johnson in favor of Jamie Arnold. Upon returning to the dugout, Pérez proceeded to destroy a water cooler with a baseball bat. (The Dodgers won the game, 6-5.) His performance soon thereafter, coupled with a legal issue stemming from an airplane flight in which a flight attendant accused Pérez of choking, threatening, and causing injury to her, forced him to an early exit from baseball.

Pérez was a highly animated player, especially when he was on the mound.  Beginning in his rookie year, after every strikeout (and sometimes even after individual strikes), he made spastic movements, usually flailing an arm into the air while crouching very low to the ground and hopping in a semicircle (in the case of a strikeout, Pérez would react in unity with the umpire who was signaling the strikeout motion).  Sometimes batters took offense to it while others realized or knew that it was just part of his routine.

Perez has gone on to play in his native Dominican Republic, to play winter ball, including the Caribbean World Series (2009) as well as the 2009 World Baseball Classic.

Facts
 Pérez hit four home runs, two triples, and eight doubles in his 250 official MLB at-bats.

References

External links

1971 births
Living people
Albuquerque Dukes players
Burlington Bees players
Dominican Republic expatriate baseball players in Canada
Dominican Republic expatriate baseball players in the United States
Gulf Coast Expos players
Harrisburg Senators players
Las Vegas Stars (baseball) players

Los Angeles Dodgers players
Major League Baseball pitchers
Major League Baseball players from the Dominican Republic
Montreal Expos players
National League All-Stars
Ottawa Lynx players
Rockford Expos players
San Bernardino Spirit players
Sumter Flyers players
Southern Maryland Blue Crabs players